Ischyropsalididae is a family of harvestmen with 31 described species in 3 genera, found in Europe and North America.

Species
The following species belong to the family Ischyropsalididae:

 Acuclavella Shear, 1986 (thorn harvestmen)
 Acuclavella cosmetoides Shear, 1986
 Acuclavella leonardi Richart & Hedin, 2013
 Acuclavella makah Richart & Hedin, 2013
 Acuclavella merickeli Shear, 1986
 Acuclavella quattuor Shear, 1986
 Acuclavella shear Richart & Hedin, 2013
 Acuclavella shoshone Shear, 1986
 Ceratolasma Goodnight & Goodnight, 1942
Ceratolasma tricantha Goodnight & Goodnight, 1942
 Ischyropsalis C.L.Koch, 1839
Ischyropsalis adamii Canestrini, 1873
Ischyropsalis alpinula Martens, 1978
Ischyropsalis cantabrica Luque & Labrada, 2012
Ischyropsalis carli Lessert, 1905
Ischyropsalis dentipalpis Canestrini, 1872
Ischyropsalis dispar Simon, 1872
Ischyropsalis gigantea Drescoe, 1968
Ischyropsalis hadzii Roewer, 1950
Ischyropsalis hellwigii (Panzer, 1794)
Ischyropsalis hellwigii hellwigii (Panzer, 1794)
Ischyropsalis hellwigii lucantei Simon, 1879
Ischyropsalis hispanica Roewer, 1953
Ischyropsalis kollari C.L. Koch, 1839
Ischyropsalis lithoclasica Schönhofer & Martens, 2010
Ischyropsalis luteipes Simon, 1872
Ischyropsalis magdalenae Simon, 1881
Ischyropsalis manicata C.L. Koch, 1869
Ischyropsalis muellneri Harmann, 1898
Ischyropsalis navarrensis Roewer, 1950
Ischyropsalis nodifera Simon, 1879
Ischyropsalis petiginosa Simon, 1913
Ischyropsalis pyrenaea Simon, 1872
Ischyropsalis ravasinii Hadži, 1942
Ischyropsalis robusta Simon, 1872
Ischyropsalis strandi  Kratochvíl, 1936

References

Further reading

External links

 

Harvestmen
Harvestman families